UX Antliae is a post-AGB and R Coronae Borealis variable  star that has a base apparent magnitude of around 11.85, with irregular dimmings down to below magnitude 18.0.

Researchers David Kilkenny and J.E. Westerhuys of the South African Astronomical Observatory confirmed that UX Antliae was an R Coronae Borealis variable in 1990 after noting the similarity of its spectrum to the RCB star W Mensae. It had been suspected of being one since 1940, but had been little-studied and exhibited no characteristic declines between 1975 and 1990.

Assuming that its absolute magnitude is around -5, it has been estimated as lying 25000 parsecs distant from Earth. Kilkenny and Westerhuys noted that its spectrum fit with that of a star of spectral class F, although was deficient in hydrogen. It has around 70% the mass of the Sun and an effective (surface) temperature of around 7000 K.

See also
R Coronae Borealis

References

External links

Antlia
R Coronae Borealis variables
Antliae, UX
J10570905-3723550